Santa Ana Arriba is a town in the Los Santos province of Panama.

Sources 
World Gazetteer: Panama – World-Gazetteer.com

Populated places in Los Santos Province